Christian Dalmose (born 1968) is a Danish handball coach and former handball player who is the head coach for the  Danish team TMS Ringsted.

Clubs as player
Dalmose has been a player in these clubs:
 Ajax København
 Virum 
 Lyngby

Clubs as coach 
Dalmose has been a coach in these clubs:
 1998–2001: Lyngby (men)
 2001–2003: Ikast-Bording EH (women)
 2004–2007: Aalborg DH (women)
 2007–2013: Ajax København (men)
 2013–Feb. 2015: Viborg HK (women)
 Feb. 2015–2016: Siofok KC (women)
 June 2016–: TMS Ringsted (men)

References 

Danish handball coaches
Danish male handball players
1968 births
Living people
Place of birth missing (living people)